Christian Hallén-Paulsen (24 December 1945 – 30 December 2012) was a Norwegian luger. He was born in Oslo. He participated at the 1964 Winter Olympics in Innsbruck, where he placed 10th in doubles (together with Jan-Axel Strøm).

References

External links

1945 births
2012 deaths
Sportspeople from Oslo
Norwegian male lugers
Olympic lugers of Norway
Lugers at the 1964 Winter Olympics